Christopher Lawrence is an American DJ and producer, specializing in progressive trance music. He has released 10 mix CDs since 1997. Lawrence has an international audience and makes frequent appearances worldwide with a career spanning twenty years. His dedication to an underground style yet precise selection have earned him the respect of both industry and fans. He is widely considered to be America's top trance DJ export.

Awards
Voted the 110th DJ in the world by DJ Magazine Top 100 poll for 2008.
Voted the #4 DJ in the world by DJ Magazine's prestigious ‘Top 100’ poll for 2006
Excluded from 2007 voting when it was alleged that Christopher had been involved in cheating but DJ Mag later cleared him of any involvement.
"Best DJ" award at the Dancestar US Awards
Winner of the "Best American DJ" at the IDMA's at WMC 2005
Winner of "America's Best DJ" 2008 held by DJ Times Magazine

Discography

Albums
2004 All or Nothing
2004 Un-Hooked: The Hook Sessions

Singles & EPs
1997 "Interceptor/Geoscape"
1997 "Navigator"
1998 "Shredder"
1999 "Renegade/Wasteland""
2000 "Cruise Control"
2000 "Rush Hour/Ride The Light"
2002 "Mind Eraser"
2002 "Nitro"
2002 "October's Child"
2003 "Warp/Acid People"
2004 "Primer"
2005 "Scorcher" (with Nicholas Bennison)
2005 "Attention" (with John 00 Fleming)
2008 "Gotham"
2008 "Beyond the Limit" (with John 00 Fleming)
2009 "Continuation" (with Nicholas Bennison)
2009 "Lie to Ourselves" (with Dave Audé & Jen Lasher)
2010 "A Little Rush" (feat. Suzie del Vecchio)
2011 "Tremor"
2011 "Rock It"
2012 "Faith In The Future"
2012 "OK To GO"
2013 "Beyond The Limit (2013 Mixes)"
2013 "Dark on Fire"
2013 "Libra"
2014 "The Dark"
2014 "Whatever You Dream"
2015 "The Whip"
2015 "Unbroken"

Remixes
1998 Pure Nova - "Awakening"
1999 Electroland - "Cheyenne"
2002 Mile High - "Night Fever"
2008 Enrique Iglesias - "Hero"
2009 U2 - "I'll Go Crazy If I Don't Go Crazy Tonight"
2011 LMFAO - "Party Rock Anthem"
2011 Lords of Acid - "Little Mighty Rabbit"
2012 Reaky - "Magnum Orca" (with Sean J. Morris)
2014 Lisa Lashes - "Virus"

DJ Compilations
1997 Rise
1999 Temptation
1999 Christopher Lawrence Presents:Hook Recordings 
2000 Trilogy Part One: Empire
2001 United States of Trance
2002 Christopher Lawrence - Around The World
2002 Christopher Lawrence - Exposure IV
2006 Christopher Lawrence - Subculture 01
2006 Christopher Lawrence - Gatecrasher: Live in Moscow
2008 Unfold 2
2008 Global Trance Grooves Vol. 1: Two Tribes(with John 00 Fleming)
2010 Rush Hour

References

External links
 http://www.christopherlawrence.com
 http://www.myspace.com/djchristopherlawrence
 Interview with Trance Hub, March 2012
 TranceSound interview, March 2011
 Download Rush Hour Radioshows

American DJs
American trance musicians
Club DJs
Living people
Electronic dance music DJs
Year of birth missing (living people)